The following musical events and releases are expected to happen in 2019 in Canada.

Events
 March – Juno Awards of 2019
 April – East Coast Music Awards
 May – Prism Prize
 June – Preliminary longlist for the 2019 Polaris Music Prize is announced
 July – SOCAN Songwriting Prize
 July – Shortlist for the Polaris Music Prize is announced
 September – Haviah Mighty wins the Polaris Music Prize for her album 13th Floor

Albums released

A
Absolutely Free, Geneva Freeport
Altameda, Time Hasn't Changed You
Anemone, Beat My Distance - February 15

B
Badge Époque Ensemble, Badge Époque Ensemble
Tim Baker, Forever Overhead - April 19
Bedouin Soundclash, MASS - October 4
Begonia, Fear
Beppie, Song Soup
Bleu Jeans Bleu, Perfecto
Dean Brody, Black Sheep - April 26
Chad Brownlee, Back in the Game - June 21
Broken Social Scene, Let’s Try the After Vol. 1 - February 15
Broken Social Scene, Let’s Try the After Vol. 2 - April 12
Jon Bryant, Cult Classic - May 17
Louise Burns, Portraits - November 8
Burnstick, Kîyânaw
Spencer Burton, The Mountain Man

C
Daniel Caesar, Case Study 01 - June 28
Alessia Cara, This Summer - September 6
Celeigh Cardinal, Stories from a Downtown Apartment
Lou-Adriane Cassidy, C'est la fin du monde à tous les jours
Tanika Charles, The Gumption - May 10
Clairmont the Second, Do You Drive? - January 31
City and Colour, A Pill for Loneliness - October 4
Bruce Cockburn, Crowing Ignites - September 20
Leonard Cohen, Thanks for the Dance - November 22
Charlotte Cornfield, The Shape of Your Name
Corridor, Junior
Les Cowboys Fringants, Les Antipodes
Amelia Curran, Live at Massey Hall
Isabelle Cyr, Brûle sur mes lèvres

D
Mac DeMarco, Here Comes the Cowboy - May 10
Devours, Iconoclast
Le Diable à Cinq, Debout!
Digawolf, Yellowstone
Céline Dion, Courage - November 15
Julie Doiron with Mount Eerie, Lost Wisdom pt. 2 - November 8
Drake, Care Package - August 2
Durham County Poets, Hand Me Down Blues

E
Efajemue, Motions and Methods
André Ethier, Croak in the Weeds

F
Lara Fabian, Papillon
Stephen Fearing, The Unconquerable Past
FET.NAT, Le Mal
Dominique Fils-Aimé, Stay Tuned!
Flore Laurentienne, Volume 1
Florian Hoefner Trio, First Spring
Flying Hórses, Reverie
FouKi, ZayZay
The Franklin Electric, In Your Head EP - August 2

G
Hannah Georgas, Imprints
Leela Gilday, North Star Calling
The Glorious Sons, A War on Everything - September 13
The Golden Seals, Something Isn't Happening
Aaron Goodvin, V
Jenn Grant, Love, Inevitable - May 31
Great Lake Swimmers, The Waves, the Wake (Acoustic) - November 8

H
Half Moon Run, A Blemish in the Great Light – November 1
Haviah Mighty, 13th Floor
Joshua Haulli, Aqqut
Headstones, PeopleSkills – October 25
Hey Major, The Station
Hollerado, Retaliation Vacation
Hunter Brothers, State of Mind – January 25
Nate Husser, 23+
Andrew Hyatt, Abel

I
Iamtheliving, In This Thing Called Life
Ice Cream, Fed Up
iskwē, acākosīk - November 8, 2019

J
James Barker Band, Singles Only - May 24
Yves Jarvis, The Same but by Different Means
Carly Rae Jepsen, Dedicated - May 17
Lyndon John X, The Warning Track
Julian Taylor Band, Avalanche - March 29
Just John x Dom Dias, Don III (April); PROJECT (November)

K
Kanen, Kanen
Kaytranada, Bubba - December 13
Kid Koala, Music To Draw To: Io - January 25
Patrick Krief, Dovetale - June 7

L
Laurence-Anne, Première apparition
Avril Lavigne, Head Above Water - February 15
Lee Harvey Osmond, Mohawk
Jean Leloup, L'Étrange pays - May 24
Murray Lightburn, Hear Me Out - February 22
Lightning Dust, Spectre
Loud, Tout ça pour ça - May 24
The Lowest of the Low, Agitpop - May 31

M
Ryan MacGrath, That Woods
Maestro Fresh Wes, Champagne Campaign - March 8
Alexandria Maillot, Benevolence - November 22
Manila Grey, No Saints Loading
Mappe Of, The Isle of Ailynn - November 1
Marianas Trench, Phantoms - March 1
Memphis, Leave With Me - February 8
Millimetrik, Make It Last Forever
Monsune, Tradition
Mounties, Heavy Meta - April 26

N
nêhiyawak, nipiy
The New Pornographers, In the Morse Code of Brake Lights - September 27
Safia Nolin, xX3m0 $0ng$ 2 $!nG @L0nG 2Xx

O
OBUXUM, Re-Birth
Ocie Elliott, We Fall In
Okan, Sombras
Ouri, We Share Our Blood

P
Partner, Saturday the 14th
Orville Peck, Pony
Philémon Cimon, Pays
PUP, Morbid Stuff - April 5
Pvrx, 3.14 - July 26

R
Billy Raffoul, Running Wild
The Reklaws, Freshman Year - August 27
Amanda Rheaume, The Skin I'm In
Riit, Ataataga - October 25
John River, The Academy - January 25
Royal Canoe, Waver
Reuben and the Dark, un love - October 25
Rheostatics, Here Come the Wolves - September 6
Ruth B, Maybe I'll Find You Again - March 22
Justin Rutledge, Passages - May 31

S
Said the Whale, Cascadia
Saint Asonia, Flawed Design
Sarahmée, Irréversible
Jacques Kuba Séguin, Migrations
Joseph Shabason, Anne EP - May 10
Shay Lia, Dangerous
Silverstein, Redux: The First Ten Years - April 12
Siskiyou, Not Somewhere - May 17
Dallas Smith, The Fall - March 13
Snotty Nose Rez Kids, Trapline
SonReal, The Aaron LP - May 10
Rae Spoon, Mental Health
The Strumbellas, Rattlesnake - March 29
Sum 41, Order in Decline - July 19
Super Duty Tough Work, Studies in Grey

T
Tariq, Telegrams - March 29
Tegan and Sara, Hey, I'm Just Like You - September 27
Devin Townsend, Empath
Tobi, STILL - May 3
Tre Mission, Orphan Black - July 26

V
Vile Creature, Preservation Rituals (2015-2018)
Leif Vollebekk, New Ways - November 1

W
Ruby Waters, Almost Naked
Dawn Tyler Watson, Mad Love
Patrick Watson, Wave - October 18
We Are the City, RIP
Whitehorse, The Northern South, Vol. 2 - January 18
WHOOP-Szo, Warrior Down
JJ Wilde, Wilde Eyes, Steady Hands
Wintersleep, In the Land Of - March 29
Donovan Woods, The Other Way
Hawksley Workman, Median Age Wasteland - March 1

Deaths
January 16 - Jean Chatillon, composer
January 16 - Alfred Kunz, composer
February 9 - Phil Western, electronic/industrial musician
February 23 - Johnnie Lovesin, rock singer
February 28 - Ed Bickert, jazz guitarist
March 6 - Charlie Panigoniak, singer-songwriter
March 22 - Joe Hall, singer-songwriter
April 1 - Vladimir Orloff, cellist
April 20 - David Zafer, violinist
May 20 - Dave Bookman, musician (The Bookmen) and radio personality (CFNY-FM, CIND-FM)
June 16 - Adam Litovitz, rock musician and film composer
November 20 - John Mann, singer and guitarist (Spirit of the West)
December 5 - Leon Cole, organist, composer and classical music radio host
December 15 - Monique Leyrac, singer
December 24 - Kelly Fraser, singer

References